Robert Altman was an American film director, producer and screenwriter. 

He is known for such films as M*A*S*H (1970), McCabe & Mrs. Miller (1971), The Long Goodbye (1973), California Split (1974), Nashville (1975), 3 Women (1977), A Wedding (1978), Popeye (1980), Secret Honor (1984), The Player (1992), Short Cuts (1993), Gosford Park (2001), and A Prairie Home Companion (2006).

Filmography

Short films

Feature films

Documentary films

Documentary shorts

Acting roles

Television

TV series

TV movies

Music videos

References 

Altman, Robert